The 1929 Brown Bears football team represented Brown University as an independent during the 1929 college football season. Led by fourth-year head coach Tuss McLaughry, the Bears compiled a record of 5–5.

Schedule

References

Brown
Brown Bears football seasons
Brown Bears football